The Suruí do Pará dialect of the Tupian Akwáwa language of Brazil is spoken in the Araguaia region in the state Pará and in the town of São João do Araguaia. It is written in the Latin script, but literacy in Suruí do Pará is extremely low.

Suruí do Pará is regarded as a dialect of Akwáwa by linguists such as Aryon Dall'Igna Rodrigues. The other two dialects of Akwáwa are Parakanã and Asuriní of Tocantins.

Names
It is also known as Aikewara, Akewara, Akewere, and Suruí.

Phonology 
Suruí has five vowels: /a, e, i, ɨ , o/. All vowels have nasalized forms, and Suruí has contrastive nasalisation.

Notes

Tupian languages